The robe à la polonaise or polonaise is a woman's garment of the later 1770s and 1780s or a similar revival style of the 1870s inspired by Polish national costume, consisting of a gown with a cutaway, draped and swagged overskirt, worn over an underskirt or petticoat. From the late 19th century, the term polonaise also described a fitted overdress which extended into long panels over the underskirt, but was not necessarily draped or swagged.

Origin and structure
As early as the 1720s, English painters had begun to portray fashionable ladies dressed in romanticized versions of the costume of a century earlier, as depicted in portraits by van Dyck and Rubens, while French Queen Marie Leszczyńska made the Polish dress popular in that decade. By the 1770s, elements of this style began to appear in fashionable dress, including the wide-brimmed hat (dubbed the "Rubens hat" in the Fashionable Magazine of 1786) and bunched-up skirts.

About the same time, French fashion adopted a number of styles of English origin, such as the close-bodied gown which they called robe à l'anglaise, and the fullness of the skirts at the back waist and over the hips.  One way to "create the fashionable bulk at the back and sides of the dress was to kilt up the overskirt by means of interior or exterior loops, buttons or tassels to form swags of material. This style ... was known as à la polonaise." This style was characterized by ankle length petticoats that revealed high-heeled walking shoes. Due to this it served as a practical garment for walking because the skirts did not drag along the ground.

Since the beginning of the 18th century, middle-class women had adopted various impromptu ways of kilting their overskirts up out of the muck of the streets.  The polonaise was a fashionable variant of this style.  The name Polonaise (or polonese) derives "obviously from Polish styles—whether it referred originally to the fur trimming or to the kilting up to one side (a Polish fashion which came from Turkish costume) is not really clear." There is some controversy over application of the name polonaise to 18th century dress.  Some sources define it as being cut in the same fashion as a robe à l'anglaise, but with cords pulling up the skirts in two places in the back, and they date the style from the beginning of the 1770s.  Others explicitly refute this: Waugh states that the robe à l'anglaise was often equipped with tapes to draw up the skirt, and on the topic of the polonaise says:

Though this term is often applied to any eighteenth-century dress with back drapery, it belongs, strictly speaking, to an over dress that appeared c. 1775.  This was cut like the man's coat of the same period, with centre back and two far-back side seams all terminating in inverted pleats, the front being in one piece with an underarm dart.  It was caught to the top of the bodice centre front ...

Aileen Ribeiro describes the polonaise as "cut in four parts, two at the front and two at the back," with the bodice closed at the top center front and sloping away at the sides, leaving a triangular gap that was filled by a false waistcoat. Sleeves could be three-quarter length or long, and various styles such as the Irish, Italian and French polonaise were described by contemporaries.   A variation on the robe à la polonaise was the robe à la circassienne, cut the same but trimmed with "oriental" tassels or fur.

19th century usage and revival

The term polonaise was applied to a variety of garments throughout the 19th century, often because their styling was thought to be Polish in inspiration. One such example was the witzchoura, a fur-lined cloak with sleeves sometimes described as being à la Polonaise. In May 1868 the Ladies' Monthly Magazine published a coloured fashion plate showing a green silk dress with an asymmetrically opening front described as being made à la Polonaise, along with a pattern for making it up.

During the very late 1860s references to historical dress became fashionable, including draped overskirts loosely based on the 18th century robe à la polonaise. In 1871 Peterson's Magazine stated that the polonaise was an overdress based on the 18th century sacque, with the bodice cut in one with the gathered-up skirt. Peterson's Magazine also described a 'Polonaise basque' as being gathered fully on the hips and forming a deep tunic in the back. Godey's Magazine for August 1871 identifies the term polonaise with two separate garments, a bodice and an overskirt:

The second paragraph quoted describes a specific style of dressing à la polonaise which was popularly known as "Dolly Varden" after the heroine of Dickens' historical novel Barnaby Rudge (set in 1780).

By the end of the 1870s and into the 1880s, the term 'polonaise' also described an overdress which resembled a long coat worn over an underskirt, sometimes with a waistcoat effect. This could be draped or undraped. In July 1894, The Sydney Mail stated:

20th century

The polonaise underwent another revival in the mid-late 1910s. A 1914 newspaper advert for McCall Patterns found in the Evening Independent announced the 'redingote polonaise' to be the height of fashion in Paris and New York. The Reading Eagle ran a fashion column in November 1915 describing the polonaise of 1914/15 as a French design consisting of a long coat-like overdress of metallic lace or elaborately decorated sheer fabric worn over a plain underdress. Another version of the polonaise was described by the Meriden Daily Journal in September 1917:

After the First World War the term fell out of regular use, although was occasionally used by fashion writers as a descriptive term in the 1930s-50s for any form of draping around the upper skirt. For example, the Ottawa Citizen in 1942 stated:

Gallery

Notes

References

Arnold, Janet: Patterns of Fashion 2: Englishwomen's Dresses and Their Construction c. 1860–1940, Wace 1966, Macmillan 1972. Revised metric edition, Drama Books 1977.  
Ashelford, Jane: The Art of Dress: Clothing and Society 1500–1914, Abrams, 1996.  
de Marly, Diana: Working Dress: A History of Occupational Clothing, Batsford (UK), 1986; Holmes & Meier (US), 1987.     

 
Tozer, Jane and Sarah Levitt, Fabric of Society: A Century of People and their Clothes 1770–1870, Laura Ashley Press,

External links
Robe à la polonaise, Kyoto Costume Institute
Robe à la polonaise, Metropolitan Museum of Art
Robe à la polonaise, Metropolitan Museum of Art
Fashion plates with robes à la polonaise, Museum of Fine Arts, Boston

History of clothing (Western fashion)
Dresses
18th-century fashion
19th-century fashion
20th-century fashion